William Massinger (1514/15–1593/94) was an English politician.

Life
He was the eldest son of Thomas Massinger, who was a sheriff and mayor of Gloucester. The family were close and his father's sister was Joan Cooke who founded the Crypt School in Gloucester.

William  was a Member (MP) of the Parliament of England for Gloucester in November 1554, 1555 and 1571. He was sheriff for Gloucester in 1562–3 and 1566–7 and made mayor for 1569–70 and 1585–6.

He married Elizabeth, and had 3 sons (including Arthur and Richard) and a daughter.

References

1515 births
1594 deaths
People from Gloucester
English MPs 1554–1555
English MPs 1555
English MPs 1571
Members of the Parliament of England (pre-1707) for Gloucester
Mayors of Gloucester